The 1980 Birmingham Open was a men's tennis tournament played on indoor carpet courts. It was the eighth and last edition of the Grand Prix Birmingham, and part of the 1980 Volvo Grand Prix circuit. It took place in Birmingham, Alabama, United States from January 14 through January 20, 1980. First-seeded Jimmy Connors won the singles title, his sixth at the event.

Singles main draw entrants

Seeds 

1 Rankings as of December 26, 1979.

Other entrants 

The following players received entry into the singles main draw as lucky losers:
  Manuel Diaz
  Tim Garcia

The following players received entry from the qualifying draw:
  David Dowlen
  Joel Bailey

Doubles main draw entrants

Seeds

Finals

Singles 

 Jimmy Connors defeated  Eliot Teltscher 6–3, 6–2
 It was Connors' 1st singles title of the year and the 80th of his career.

Doubles 

 Wojtek Fibak /  Tom Okker defeated  José Luis Clerc /  Ilie Nastase, 6–3, 6–3

References

External links
 ITF tournament edition details

Birmingham Open
Birmingham Open
Birmingham Open
Birmingham Open